The Xiangyangchuan–Hayudao railway is a railway line in Jiamusi, Heilongjiang, China. The line has also been referred to as the Tongjiang local railway.

History
Construction began on 20 October 2003. The first section to be completed, between Xiangyangchuan and Tongjiang, opened for freight service on 11 December 2005. Passenger service at Tongjiang railway station was introduced in 2016.

Specification
The southern terminus of the line is at Xiangyangchuan, on the Fulitun–Qianjinzhen railway. The Tongjiang-Nizhneleninskoye railway bridge, currently under construction, will cross the Amur and connect the line to Russia.

References

Railway lines in China
Railway lines opened in 2005